Saint Sarah may refer to:
Saint Sarah, Sara-la-Kali, patron saint of the Roma
Sarah, wife of the patriarch Abraham
Sarah the Martyr, Christian saint
Saint Sarah (Hannah Montana), a recurring character in the television show Hannah Montana

See also
Sarah (female name)

Sarah